John Bascom (May 1, 1827October 2, 1911) was an American professor, college president and writer.

Life
He was born on May 1, 1827 in Genoa, New York, and was a graduate of Williams College with the class of 1849.  He graduated from the Andover Theological Seminary in 1855. Aside from the degrees he received in those places, he held many other scholarly and honorary degrees. He was professor of rhetoric at Williams College from 1855 to 1874, and was president of the University of Wisconsin from 1874 to 1887. He retired in 1903 and died in Williamstown, Massachusetts, on October 2, 1911.

He was the author of some thirty or forty books.  He said in his biography the books cost him more money than he ever received from their publication.  But he also included that he was glad to have written them and is only sorry that he could not have been of more service to his fellow men.  He greatly influenced Senator Robert M. La Follette, Sr. during the latter's time at the University of Wisconsin.

In 1853, John married Abbie Burt, who died shortly thereafter. John then wed Emma Curtiss, to whom he was married for over fifty years. Their three children, Jean, George and Florence, all graduated from the University of Wisconsin.

Legacy and honors
Bascom Hill and Bascom Hall on the campus of the University of Wisconsin-Madison are both named for him.  Bascom House, the home of the Williams College Office of Admissions, is also named for Bascom.

During World War II the Liberty ship  was built in Panama City, Florida, and named in his honor.

See also
 List of French Americans, famous people of French descent
 Famous people with Huguenot ancestry

Relatives of note

 Earl W. Bascom, cowboy artist/sculptor, rodeo pioneer, "Father of Modern Rodeo"
 Florence Bascom, America's first female geologist
 George Nicholas Bascom, army officer of Apache Wars
 Henry Bidleman Bascom, Congressional Chaplain 1824-26
 John U. Bascom, American surgeon
 Willard Bascom, oceanographer
 Bryant Butler Brooks, cowboy, rancher and Governor of Wyoming 1905-1911
 Frederic S. Remington, western artist and sculptor, "Father of Cowboy Sculpture"
 Jedediah S. Smith, American explorer, mountain man
 Franchot Tone, American actor
 Wolfe Tone, "Father of Irish Republicanism"
 S. Dilworth Young, American religious leader

Books and articles
Many of these are in the public domain and fully viewable at Google Books.
 An Appeal To Young Men On The Use Of Tobacco (1850)
 Philosophy Of Rhetoric (1866)
 The Principles Of Psychology (1869)
 Aesthetics (1871)
 Science, Philosophy And Religion (1871); (1872)
 Philosophy Of English Literature (1874)
 Education And The State (1877)
 Comparative Psychology (1878)
 Ethics (1879)
 Natural Theology (1880)
 The Science Of Mind (1881)
 The Lawyer And The Lawyer's Questions (1882)
 Problems In Philosophy (1885)
 Prohibition And Common Sense (1885)
 Sociology (1887)
 The New Theology (1891)
 Address Before The YMCA Of The Mass. Agricultural College (1892)
 An Historical Interpretation Of Philosophy (1893)
 Social Theory (1895)
 Evolution And Religion (1897)
 The Goodness Of God (1901)
 The Remedies Of Trusts (1901)
 The College Tax Exemption (1907)
 Things Learned By Living (1913)
 Sermons And Addresses (1913)

References

Attribution

Further reading
 Hoeveler, J. David. John Bascom and the Origins of the Wisconsin Idea. Madison: University of Wisconsin Press, 2016.

External links

John A. Bascom (President: 1874-1887) at the University of Wisconsin–Madison

1827 births
1911 deaths
People from Genoa, New York
Leaders of the University of Wisconsin-Madison
Andover Theological Seminary alumni
Williams College alumni
Williams College faculty
Writers from New York (state)
Writers from Wisconsin